West Lincoln Township is a township in Mitchell County, Iowa, USA.

History
The original Lincoln Township was organized in 1858.  In 1904, West Lincoln Township was established when it was separated from East Lincoln.

References

Townships in Mitchell County, Iowa
Townships in Iowa